is a railway station on the Rikuu East Line in the town of  Mogami, Yamagata, Japan, operated by the East Japan Railway Company (JR East).

Lines
Ōhori Station is served by the Rikuu East Line, and is located 69.5 rail kilometers from the terminus of the line at Kogota Station.

Station layout
The station has one side platform, serving a bidirectional single track. The station building is built in the style of a log cabin. The station is unattended.

History
Ōhori Station opened on February 1, 1949. The station was absorbed into the JR East network upon the privatization of JNR on April 1, 1987.

Surrounding area
 
Mogami Onsen
Uzen-Ōhori Post Office

See also
List of railway stations in Japan

External links

 JR East Station information 

Railway stations in Yamagata Prefecture
Rikuu East Line
Railway stations in Japan opened in 1949
Mogami, Yamagata